Charles Joseph McNamee (December 5, 1890 – May 2, 1964) was an American attorney and jurist who served as a United States district judge of the United States District Court for the Northern District of Ohio.

Early life and education
Born in Cleveland, Ohio, McNamee received a Bachelor of Laws from Cleveland Law School (now Cleveland State University College of Law) in 1917. He served in the United States Army during World War I from 1917 to 1919, where he entered as a private and rose to the rank of 2nd lieutenant in the Army Service Corps. He left France in September 1919. He then entered private practice in Cleveland from 1921 to 1933.

Career 
He was chief assistant county prosecutor for Cuyahoga County, Ohio from 1933 to 1938. He was a Judge of the Common Pleas Court for Cuyahoga County from 1939 to 1949, and of the Court of Appeals of Ohio from 1949 to 1951.

On February 8, 1951, McNamee was nominated by President Harry S. Truman to a seat on the United States District Court for the Northern District of Ohio vacated by Judge Robert Nugen Wilkin. McNamee was confirmed by the United States Senate on March 6, 1951, and received his commission on March 9, 1951. He served as Chief Judge in 1960. McNamee remained on the court until his death on May 2, 1964.

References

Sources
 

1890 births
1964 deaths
Judges of the United States District Court for the Northern District of Ohio
United States district court judges appointed by Harry S. Truman
20th-century American judges
Cleveland–Marshall College of Law alumni
Ohio state court judges
Judges of the Ohio District Courts of Appeals
United States Army officers
United States Army personnel of World War I
Lawyers from Cleveland